Uttoxeter railway station serves the town of Uttoxeter, Staffordshire, England. It is on the Crewe-Derby Line, which is also a Community rail line known as the North Staffordshire line. The station is owned by Network Rail and managed by East Midlands Railway.

History

North Staffordshire Railway
Prior to 1881, three different stations had been in use simultaneously, all being built by the NSR.

The section from Stoke-on-Trent to Uttoxeter was opened on 7 August 1848. The first station opened in the town was Uttoxeter Bridge Street station, which opened the same day as the line opened from Stoke. However the station buildings were not complete and temporarily the crossing keeper's hut nearby was used. The following month on 11 September 1848 the line was completed through to Burton and through running between Stoke and Derby began. When the Churnet Valley Line was opened on 13 July 1849, Uttoxeter Junction station was opened on the mainline to serve as an interchange with the Churnet Valley line and on the same date, Uttoxeter Dove Bank station was also opened on the Churnet Valley line.
 

Uttoxeter then had three stations in total. In 1880, the NSR decided to close all three and construct a north to west line forming a triangular junction. A new Uttoxeter station replaced all three at this new junction and opened on 10 October 1881. There is a model of the 1881 station at the Uttoxeter Heritage Centre.

The Stafford and Uttoxeter Railway which opened in 1867 also used the station but this line was operated by the Great Northern Railway.

London, Midland and Scottish Railway
On 1 January 1923, under the Railways Act 1921, the North Staffordshire Railway was absorbed by the London, Midland and Scottish Railway (LMS). During this period of time the Stafford and Uttoxeter Railway, which had become part of the London and North Eastern Railway, closed to passengers on 4 December 1939, but the line remained open for goods traffic until 5 March 1951.

British Rail

The LMS was nationalised in 1948 and became part of British Rail.

The last mainline steam train used the station on 16 September 1957 and thereafter an hourly DMU service operated which has been used ever since.

Passenger services on the Churnet Valley line from Uttoxeter towards  and  ceased operation 2 January 1965, and the trains towards Ashbourne and Buxton ceased on 1 November 1954. The last mainline steam train ran on 16 September 1957. The engine sheds closed on 7 December 1964. A siding which was part of the old Churnet valley line remained until the 1980s.

The station buildings were destroyed by fire on 9 May 1987 and the station is now unstaffed.

Privatisation
On 2 March 1997, the station became part of the Central Trains franchise. Trains would run from the station to Manchester Airport and Skegness. In 2004, the Manchester Airport train was cut back to Crewe and, in September 2005, the Skegness train was cut short to Derby.

The Central Trains franchise expired on 11 November 2007 and the station and its services were taken over by East Midlands Trains. When this franchise expired in August 2019, East Midlands Railway began operations and in May 2021, services were once again extended past Derby to provide Uttoxeter with a direct link to Long Eaton, Nottingham and Newark Castle.

Facilities
The station is unstaffed and facilities are limited. There is a shelter on each platform as well as modern help points and bicycle storage. A ticket machine was installed in 2021. There is a car park at the station, and a taxi rank just next to the station. Step-free access is available to both platforms.

It is the closest railway station to Alton Towers to which it is linked by an infrequent bus service. There is also direct access to Uttoxeter Racecourse, which is adjacent to the station.

Services
All services at Uttoxeter are operated by East Midlands Railway.

During the late evenings, services terminate at Nottingham instead of Newark Castle.

On Sundays, the station is served by an hourly service between Crewe and Derby only although no trains operate before 14:00.

Additional trains serve the station during the Midlands Grand National to cater for the increased passenger numbers for the event.

Bus Connections
The station is served by the First Potteries Kingfisher service which provides hourly connections to Hanley as well as the Midland Classic routes 402, 402A and 403 services to Burton upon Trent.

No bus services serve the station on Sundays.

References

Further reading

External links 

 Dudley Mall - Stoke-on-Trent to Derby Line
 The North Staffordshire Railway Study Group

Railway stations in Staffordshire
DfT Category F1 stations
Former North Staffordshire Railway stations
Railway stations in Great Britain opened in 1848
Railway stations in Great Britain opened in 1849
Railway stations in Great Britain closed in 1881
Railway stations in Great Britain opened in 1881
Railway stations served by East Midlands Railway
1849 establishments in England
Uttoxeter
1881 establishments in England